The 1991–92 Northern Football League season was the 94th in the history of Northern Football League, a football competition in England.

Division One

Division One featured 17 clubs which competed in the division last season, along with three new clubs, promoted from Division Two:
 Easington Colliery
 Langley Park
 West Auckland Town

League table

Division Two

Division Two featured 16 clubs which competed in the division last season, along with four new clubs.
 Clubs relegated from Division One:
 Alnwick Town
 Durham City
 Stockton
 Plus:
 Dunston Federation Brewery, joined from the Wearside Football League

League table

References

External links
 Northern Football League official site

Northern Football League seasons
1991–92 in English football leagues